Rocky Marciano fought two celebrated boxing matches with Ezzard Charles. The first match took place on 17 June 1954; and the second on 17 September 1954. The first fight went the distance with Marciano winning on points through a unanimous decision. In the second bout Marciano knocked out Charles in the eighth round.

Marciano was 30 years old at the time of the first Marciano–Charles fight and Charles 33.

Marciano–Charles I

Rounds 1–4
The first four rounds of the first Marciano–Charles bout revealed Charles's superior technical expertise. Marciano was outfought and outmaneuvered in these early rounds. Charles threw body shots at Marciano with great success; he also opened a two inch long and one inch deep cut over Marciano's left eye. Marciano's cut man Freddie Brown, who later worked for Roberto Durán, would comment that he could not remember treating a cut worse than this one.

Rounds 5–9
In the fifth round, Charles surprisingly became defensive and stopped dictating the pace of the fight. In the early rounds, Charles had thrown body punches at Marciano with great success; by the fifth round Charles was no longer throwing these punches. Without making any effort to protect his eye, Marciano carried the fight to Charles, went on the offensive, found his rhythm, and seized the initiative in the fight. By the end of round 9, Marciano's face was a crimson mask, and yet he had managed to land so many punches on Charles that he was ahead in the scoring.

Rounds 10–15
By the 10th round, Marciano was clearly ahead and yet he kept fighting as if the decision was in doubt, and kept trying for a knockout. Charles managed to stay on his feet while withstanding Marciano's punches, but his face gradually started changing for the worse. His right eye closed, his lower lip was split and swollen, and a blood clot appeared on his left jaw. At the end Marciano won the fight with a unanimous decision (scored 8-5, 9-5 and 8-6 in favor of the champion). Ruby Goldstein, who refereed this fight, commented:

Marciano–Charles II
The second Marciano–Charles bout proved to be surprisingly dramatic with both the fighters exerting dominance in different stages of the fight. Charles had put on weight for this fight, and his strategy seemed to be to go for a swift knockout.

Early rounds
Charles won the first round by landing some clean punches on Marciano's jaw. In the second round, Marciano hit Charles with a body blow, and then knocked Charles down on the canvas. Marciano now went for the kill, but Charles proved too slippery and survived the round. The fight then became an offensive–defensive affair with Marciano constantly on the attack and Charles content to do defensive boxing while throwing only occasional punches. The fight became dull and insipid with about the only excitement coming from Marciano's usage of roughhouse tactics like throwing low blows and hitting after the bell. The fouls did not affect the judges who had Marciano well ahead after the fifth round.

A twist in the tale
Something strange happened in the sixth round because of which Ezzard Charles almost won the fight. As Charles and Marciano emerged from a clinch towards the end of the round, Marciano was seen sporting a deep wound on his left nostril. It was unclear how Marciano got hurt with some claiming it was due to Charles's punches, and Marciano laying the blame on Charles's elbow. Marciano now started bleeding profusely from the wound; he would later observe: "I knew something was wrong because the blood was running like from a faucet. "Meanwhile, Charles's corner was feeling triumphant after the sixth round; Charles was advised by them to keep throwing punches at Marciano's nose.

Seventh round
In the seventh round, Marciano went out with a makeshift patch over his nose; the device was quickly knocked off by Charles's punches as Charles went after Marciano's nose. Remarkably enough, Marciano won the seventh round by landing more blows than Charles who was left staggered at the end of the round. Even so, it was Marciano who was in danger because of the nose wound which continued to gush blood. The word was out that the fight would only be allowed to continue for one or two more rounds.

Eighth round
In the interval before the eighth round, Marciano's corner advised him to go after Charles's body. Instead, he decided to ignore the advice and went after his opponent's head. As Marciano later explained:

With 24 seconds left for the end of the eighth round, Ezzard Charles was knocked out by Marciano. It was later suggested that the extra weight Charles had put on for this fight resulted in him providing a slower target for Marciano.

Aftermath
Many critics regard the first Marciano–Charles fight to be among the greatest heavyweight boxing bouts. The second Marciano–Charles fight is considered by some critics to be among Marciano's finest performances in his boxing career with a few claiming it was his best fight. The rematch would go on to be listed as The Ring magazine Fight of the Year for 1954.

The first and second bouts were both staged at the Yankee Stadium, New York.

References

Boxing matches
1954 in boxing
Rocky Marciano
June 1954 sports events in the United States
September 1954 sports events in the United States
1954 in sports in New York City
1954 in American sports